The 1928 United States Senate election in Wisconsin was held on November 6, 1928.

Incumbent Republican U.S. Senator Robert La Follette Jr., who had won a special election to finish his late father's term in 1925, was elected to a full term in office. 

La Follette had to fend off two challenges from his own party, defeating George W. Mead in the party primary and Republican State Senator William H. Markham in the general election. Markham ran as a pro-Hoover "Regular Republican."

Republican primary

Candidates
Robert M. La Follette Jr., incumbent Senator since 1925
George W. Mead

Results

Democratic primary

Candidates
 M.K. Reilly

Results

Prohibition primary

Candidates
 David W. Emerson

Results

General election

Candidates
 David W. Emerson (Prohibition)
 John Kasun (Workers)
 Richard Koeppel (Labor)
 Robert M. La Follette Jr., incumbent Senator since 1925 (Republican)
 William H. Markham (Independent Republican)
 M.K. Reilly (Democratic) (withdrew)

Campaign
Democratic nominee M.K. Reilly dropped out of the race on October 8.

Results

See also 
 1928 United States Senate elections

References 

1928
Wisconsin
United States Senate